Innocent Defendant is a South Korean television series starring Ji Sung, Um Ki-joon, Kwon Yu-ri, Oh Chang-seok, and Uhm Hyun-kyung. It aired on SBS from January 23 to March 21, 2017 on Mondays and Tuesdays at 22:00 (KST) for 18 episodes.

Synopsis
Park Jung-woo is a prosecutor at Seoul Central District Prosecutors' Office. One day, he wakes up and finds himself a convict on death row. Suffering from temporary amnesia, Jung-woo has no idea what transpired to land him in prison. He struggles to recover his memory and clear his name.

Cast

Main
 Ji Sung as Park Jung-woo
A Prosecutor of the Seoul Central District Prosecutor's Office. The head of the violent crimes investigative division who never loses a case.
 Um Ki-joon as Cha Sun-ho / Cha Min-ho 
 Han Ki-won as young Cha Sun-ho 
 Han Ki-woong as young Cha Min-ho
Cha Sun-ho is the President of Chamyung Group and Cha Min-ho's older brother.
Cha Min-ho is the Vice President of Chamyung Group and the younger brother of Cha Sun-ho. He is neglected and abused by his father.
 Kwon Yu-ri as Seo Eun-hye
A defense lawyer who strives to be eloquent and rational, but loses in court every single time. She takes up Jung-woo's case.
Oh Chang-seok as Kang Jun-hyuk
Jung-woo's best friend and fellow Prosecutor at the Seoul Central District Prosecutor's Office.
Uhm Hyun-kyung as Na Yeon-hee
Sun-ho's wife and daughter of a bankrupt chaebol, who has a fiery ambition to succeed.

Supporting

People around Jung-woo
 Son Yeo-eun as Yoon Ji-soo, Jung-woo's wife.
 Shin Rin-ah as Park Ha-yeon, Jung-woo's daughter.
 Kang Sung-min as Yoon Tae-soo, Jung-woo's brother-in-law. A prison officer. 
 Sung Byung-suk as Oh Jung-hee, Jung-woo's mother-in-law.

Prosecutors
 Park Ho-san as Choi Dae-hong
 Lee Shin-sung as Ko Dong-yoon
 Han Ji-woo as Yeo Min-kyung
Jung Dong-gyu as Deputy Prosecutor General

Wol-jeong Prison
Kim Min-seok as Lee Sung-gyu
Born on 16 December 1990, Lee Sung-gyu is a convict charged with assault. The prison's quick-witted mood maker, who helps take care of Jung-woo.
 Jo Jae-yoon as Shin Cheol-sik
Jung-woo's jail-mate who was serving life imprisonment for murder. He was jailed by Jung-woo for killing his boss, later to be revealed that he was falsely accused of the crime.
 Yoon Yong-hyun as Chief Priest
 Woo Hyun as Han Sang-wook aka Milyang 
A former doctor, he is a life convict and who had been imprisoned for twenty-years by the time he became Jung-woo's jail-mate.
 Oh Dae-hwan as Cheon Pil-jae / Moong Chi aka Bundle
Jung-woo's helper. 
 Jo Jae-ryong as Oh Hyuk-joo aka Rockfish
Jung-woo's jail-mate.

Chamyung Group
 Jang Gwang as Cha Young-woon
 Ye Soo-jung as Myung Geum-ja
 Kim Kyung-nam as Executive Secretary

Extended
Kim Seung-hoon as Prison Security Chief
Baek Ji-won as Eun-hye's aunt
Seo In-sung as Cha Eun-soo, Yeon-hee's son.
Lee Jung-hun as Yeo Sung-soo
Oh Seung-hoon as Kim Seok, Cha Min-ho's henchman.
Seo Jeong-yeon as Kim Sun-hwa, a psychiatrist.
Hwang Young-hee as Cheon Pil-jae's older sister

Special appearances
 Kim Hwan as News Anchor (ep. 1)
 Seo Dong-won as Detective Oh Jong-min (ep. 3, 7-8)
 Han Kyu-won as Lee Chan-young (ep. 6)
 Oh Yeon-ah as Jennifer Lee (ep. 7 & 8)
 Lee Deok-hwa as Prisoner #2460 (ep. 8)
 Lee Si-eon (ep. 18)

Production
Innocent Defendant is directed by Jo Young-kwang of 49 Days, and written by Choi Su-jin of City Hunter. Its first script reading took place on November 18, 2016 at the SBS Studio in Ilsan, South Korea.

Original soundtrack

In December 2016, co-producer Signal Entertainment Group signed a deal with KT Music for the soundtrack of Innocent Defendant.

Part 1

Part 2

Part 3

Part 4

Reception
The series was a commercial success with over 25% ratings and topped popularity charts. It received praise for its plot-focused narrative, impressive acting performance of lead actors Ji Sung and Um Ki-joon and its ability to resonate with the public. The Korea Times said the drama is like a "warning sign to the evil and powerful figures of the real world"; and Yonhap News Agency praise Ji's character as "putting a relatable human face on a tale that is often disturbingly grim and somber". However, it also had criticisms about its unrealistic plot and its tendency to repeat the same pattern of twists and turns to keep viewers hooked.

Ratings
In the table below,  represent the lowest ratings and  represent the highest ratings.

Awards and nominations

Adaptations
The series was adapted in Turkey as "Mahkum - Şehrin Kralları" and it has been broadcast on Fox TV.

References

External links
 Innocent Defendant official SBS website 
 Innocent Defendant at The Story Works

Seoul Broadcasting System television dramas
South Korean legal television series
South Korean thriller television series
Television series by Signal Entertainment Group
Television series by Studio S
2017 South Korean television series debuts
2017 South Korean television series endings